Schwarzenfels is a village in the German municipality of Sinntal in Main-Kinzig-Kreis in the state of Hesse.

The population in 2009 was 577.

References 

Villages in Hesse